From Silence is a progressive rock album by Troy Donockley and Dave Bainbridge. It is an improvised piece recorded in the setting of the Lincoln Cathedral and released in 2005.

Two members of Iona got together in the cathedral to improvise music at the instigation of Voiceprint's Bob Ayling, the result is an hour of atmospheric, Celtic flavoured, quiet music.

This recording shows Troy as a multi-skilled woodwind player. His main instrument is the Uilleann Pipes adding also Low Whistles, Electric and Acoustic Guitars, Keys, Cittern and Mandolin. His musical partner here is his colleague from Iona the guitarist and keyboard player Dave Bainbridge.

Personnel

Band
Troy Donockley - Uillean Pipes, Low Whistles, Acoustic Guitars, Tin Whistles, Vocals
Dave Bainbridge - Piano, electric guitars, bouzouki

Track listing
Disc - Total Time 56:14
From Silence: Part One  – 9:45
From Silence: Part Two  – 6:15
From Silence: Part Three  – 15:51
From Silence: Part Four  – 9:04
From Silence: Part Five  – 9:44
From Silence: Part Six  – 5:35

Release details
2005, UK, Open Sky OPENVP5CD

Troy Donockley albums
Dave Bainbridge albums
2005 albums